Chuck Murphy may refer to:
 Chuck Murphy (bishop)
 Chuck Murphy (singer)

See also
 Charles Murphy (disambiguation)